Mark Rein may refer to:

Mark Rein (journalist) (1909–?), Menshevik journalist
Mark Rein (software executive), vice president and co-founder of Epic Games

See also
Mark Rein-Hagen (born 1964), role-playing, card, video and board game designer